Rhabdomastix is a genus of crane fly in the family Limoniidae.

Species
Subgenus Lurdia Stary, 2003
R. falcata Stary, 2003
R. furva Stary, 2003
R. inclinata Edwards, 1938
R. loewi Stary, 2003
R. lurida (Loew, 1873)
R. luridoides Alexander, 1940
R. mendli Stary, 2003
R. neolurida Alexander, 1943
R. robusta Stary, 2003
R. setigera Alexander, 1943
R. sublurida Stary, 2003
R. tatrica Stary, 2003
Subgenus Rhabdomastix Skuse, 1890
R. afra Wood, 1952
R. almorae Alexander, 1960
R. alticola Alexander, 1944
R. angusticellula Alexander, 1957
R. arnaudi Alexander, 1964
R. atrata Alexander, 1925
R. austrocaledoniensis Alexander, 1948
R. beckeri (Lackschewitz, 1935)
R. borealis Alexander, 1924
R. brachyneura Alexander, 1933
R. brevicellula Alexander, 1976
R. brittoni Alexander, 1933
R. californiensis Alexander, 1921
R. callosa Alexander, 1923
R. caparaoensis Alexander, 1944
R. chilota Alexander, 1929
R. coloradensis Alexander, 1917
R. corax Stary, 2004
R. crassa Stary, 2004
R. edwardsi Tjeder, 1967
R. emodicola Alexander, 1957
R. eugeni Stary, 2004
R. fasciger Alexander, 1920
R. feuerborni Alexander, 1931
R. filata Stary, 2004
R. flava (Alexander, 1911)
R. flavidula Edwards, 1926
R. fumipennis Alexander, 1939
R. galactoptera (Bergroth, 1888)
R. georgica Stary, 2004
R. glabrivena Alexander, 1981
R. hansoni Alexander, 1939
R. himalayensis Alexander, 1960
R. hirticornis (Lackschewitz, 1940)
R. holomelania Alexander, 1935
R. hudsonica Alexander, 1933
R. hynesi Alexander, 1966
R. illudens Alexander, 1914
R. incapax Stary, 2005
R. indigena Alexander, 1958
R. intermedia Alexander, 1929
R. ioogoon Alexander, 1948
R. isabella Alexander, 1927
R. japonica Alexander, 1924
R. laeta (Loew, 1873)
R. laetoidea Stary, 2004
R. laneana Alexander, 1979
R. leonardi Alexander, 1930
R. leucophaea Savchenko, 1976
R. lipophleps Alexander, 1948
R. longiterebrata Alexander, 1938
R. luteola Alexander, 1944
R. manipurensis Alexander, 1964
R. margarita Alexander, 1940
R. mediovena Alexander, 1933
R. megacantha Alexander, 1959
R. mexicana Alexander, 1938
R. microxantha Alexander, 1958
R. minicola Alexander, 1934
R. minima Alexander, 1926
R. monilicornis Alexander, 1926
R. nebulifera Alexander, 1957
R. neozelandiae Alexander, 1922
R. nigroapicata Alexander, 1940
R. nigropumila Alexander, 1964
R. nilgirica Alexander, 1949
R. normalis Alexander, 1972
R. nuttingi Alexander, 1950
R. omeina Alexander, 1932
R. optata Alexander, 1923
R. ostensackeni Skuse, 1890
R. otagana Alexander, 1922
R. parvicornis Alexander, 1969
R. parvula Alexander, 1938
R. perglabrata Alexander, 1962
R. peruviana Alexander, 1926
R. plaumanni Alexander, 1947
R. posticata Alexander, 1929
R. sadoensis Alexander, 1958
R. sagana Alexander, 1925
R. satipoensis Alexander, 1944
R. schmidiana Alexander, 1958
R. septentrionalis Alexander, 1914
R. shansica Alexander, 1954
R. shardiana Alexander, 1957
R. spatulifera Alexander, 1940
R. strictivena Alexander, 1964
R. subfasciger Alexander, 1927
R. subparva Stary, 1971
R. synclera Alexander, 1928
R. tantilla Alexander, 1938
R. teriensis Alexander, 1962
R. tonnoirana Alexander, 1934
R. trichiata Alexander, 1923
R. trichophora Alexander, 1943
R. trochanterata Edwards, 1928
R. tugela Alexander, 1964
R. unipuncta Alexander, 1944
R. ussurica Alexander, 1934
R. usuriensis Alexander, 1925
R. vittithorax Alexander, 1923
R. wilsoniana Alexander, 1934
Unplaced
R. caudata (Lundbeck, 1898)
R. leptodoma Alexander, 1943
R. monticola Alexander, 1916
R. parva (Siebke, 1863)
R. subarctica Alexander, 1933
R. subcaudata Alexander, 1927

References

Limoniidae
Nematocera genera